William Findlay (January 15, 1904, in Kilmarnock, Scotland; died January 21, 1981, in Augusta, Georgia) was an American soccer wing forward who earned four caps with the U.S. national team between 1924 and 1928.  He also spent two seasons playing in the American Soccer League.

Olympic teams
In 1924, Findlay was selected to the U.S. soccer team which competed in the 1924 Summer Olympics. He played in both U.S. games, a win over Estonia followed by a second round loss to Uruguay. Findlay did not play with the U.S. again until the 1928 Summer Olympics. At that tournament, the U.S. lost its first game to Argentina. Following its elimination from the Olympics, the U.S. played one exhibition game, a 3–3 tie with Poland.

Club career
Findlay returned to Scotland as a teenager to play for Third Lanark of the Scottish Football League between 1921 and early 1923 (there were other players of the same name active at the time, including another at Third Lanark from summer 1923, but they do not appear to have coincided). At the time of his international selection in both 1924 and in 1928, he was playing for Galicia S.C. Following the Olympics, he signed with the New York Nationals of the American Soccer League. He also spent the 1930 fall season with the Brooklyn Wanderers.

Personal life
William's family emigrated to the United States from Scotland in around 1914, when he was 10 years old. His father was Scottish international soccer player Robert Findlay, and his uncle Tom Findlay was also a professional; the brothers played together for Kilmarnock, Motherwell and Port Glasgow Athletic during their careers.

See also
List of Scottish football families 
List of United States men's international soccer players born outside the United States

References

1904 births
1981 deaths
Footballers from Kilmarnock
Soccer players from New Jersey
Scottish footballers
American soccer players
Third Lanark A.C. players
Scottish Football League players
Scottish emigrants to the United States
American Soccer League (1921–1933) players
Footballers at the 1924 Summer Olympics
Footballers at the 1928 Summer Olympics
New York Nationals (ASL) players
Brooklyn Wanderers players
Olympic soccer players of the United States
United States men's international soccer players
Association football forwards